Washington Mills is a hamlet  and census-designated place in the Town of New Hartford, a suburb of Utica, New York, United States.

Washington Mills is located off New York State Route 8.

References

Hamlets in New York (state)
Utica, New York
Census-designated places in New York (state)
Census-designated places in Oneida County, New York
Hamlets in Oneida County, New York